William Vacchiano (May 23, 1912 – September 19, 2005) was a trumpeter and trumpet instructor.

Originally from Portland, Maine, Vacchiano studied trumpet at age 12.  At 14 years old, he was playing in the Portland Symphony. For five years (1930-1935), he studied under Max Schlossberg at the latter's studio in The Bronx. He joined the New York Philharmonic in 1935 as third/assistant principal trumpet and appointed principal trumpet in 1942 by Bruno Walter. He taught at the Juilliard School for 67 years (1935-2002). He was also a professor at the Mannes College of Music from 1937–83 and the Manhattan School of Music from 1935-2002. His students included Wynton Marsalis, Philip Smith, Charles Schlueter, Gerard Schwarz, Manny Laureano, and Miles Davis.

His obituary in The New York Times quoted him saying:

"This, to me, is happiness. When I feel bad I go down to the studio in my house, I pick up my horn and I'm in seventh heaven. That's what music should be like."

References 

Biography from Juilliard.
A Miles Davis Website

External links 
Obituary at International Trumpet Guild.
Article about Bill Vacchiano by Dorothy Chansky.

1912 births
2005 deaths
American classical trumpeters
American male trumpeters
Juilliard School faculty
Manhattan School of Music faculty
Musicians from Portland, Maine
20th-century American musicians
20th-century classical musicians
20th-century trumpeters
20th-century American male musicians